CIU may refer to:
Crash Investigation Unit, an Australian factual television program
Working Men's Club and Institute Union, an association of social clubs in the United Kingdom
Chippewa County International Airport in Sault Ste. Marie, Michigan (IATA Code: CIU)
Columbia International University, a Bible college and seminary in Columbia, South Carolina
Cyprus International University, Cyprus, North Cyprus
Cape plc, a construction company listed in the Alternative Investment Market under ticker CIU
 Customs and Immigration Union (Canada)
 Chronic idiopathic urticaria, also known as hives
 Collective investment undertaking, another term for an investment fund
 Conviction Integrity Unit, a division of a prosecutorial office, working to prevent, identify, and remedy false convictions
Cédula de Identidad de Uruguay, the Uruguayan identity card
Convergència i Unió, a Catalan political party